Central Norway Regional Health Authority is a state-owned regional health authority responsible for operating the hospitals in the counties of Nord-Trøndelag, Sør-Trøndelag and Møre og Romsdal in Norway. Based in Stjørdal, the authority operates five health trusts that operate nine hospitals. It is led by chairman Kolbjørn Almlid (Centre Party) and CEO Stig Arild Slørdahl.

All real estate related to the hospitals is managed by Helsebygg Midt-Norge, a division of the authority. Other central agencies include Helse Midt-Norge IT (Hemit) that operates the information technology systems as well as Midt-Norsk Helsenett that operates the healthcare information network in Central Norway. St. Olav's Hospital cooperates with the Norwegian University of Science and Technology to provide medical education in Trondheim.

Subsidiaries
Møre og Romsdal Hospital Trust
Ålesund Hospital
Kristiansund Hospital
Molde Hospital
Volda Hospital
Nord-Trøndelag Hospital Trust
Levanger Hospital
Namsos Hospital
St. Olav's Hospital Trust
St. Olav's University Hospital, Trondheim
Orkdal Hospital
Central Norway Ambulance
Central Norway Pharmaceutical Trust

Defunct subsidiaries:
Central Norway Drug and Alcohol Treatment Trust
 Nordmøre and Romsdal Hospital Trust
Sunnmøre Hospital Trust

Real estate companies of Norway
Government agencies of Norway
Health trusts of Norway
Companies based in Trøndelag